The Stronger Sex is a 1931 British drama film directed by Gareth Gundrey and starring Colin Clive, Adrianne Allen and Gordon Harker. It was made by Gainsborough Pictures and shot at the company's Islington Studios in London.

Synopsis
The screenplay concerns a man who rescues his wife's lover during a disaster at a coal mine.

Cast
 Colin Clive as Warren Barrington
 Adrianne Allen as Mary Thorpe
 Gordon Harker as Parker
 Martin Lewis as John Brent
 Renee Clama as Joan Merivale
 Elsa Lanchester as Thompson

References

Bibliography
Wood, Linda. British Films, 1927–1939. British Film Institute, 1986.

External links

1931 films
1931 drama films
British films based on plays
Films directed by Gareth Gundrey
British drama films
Films set in England
Gainsborough Pictures films
Islington Studios films
British black-and-white films
1930s English-language films
1930s British films